SZ Crateris is a binary star system in the southern constellation Crater. Both components belong to the main sequence: the primary star has a spectral classification of K5V while the secondary is a red dwarf of spectral class M0V. The radius of the primary is about 66% the radius of the Sun, while the secondary member is only about 42% of the solar radius. In 1994, the two stars were separated by 5.1 arc seconds, which is equivalent to 112.41 astronomical units.

SZ Crateris is classified as a marginal BY Draconis variable, and has an optical variability cycle of 11.58 days. (The star causing the variability is unspecified.) Compared to the Sun, SZ Crateris has a slightly higher proportion of elements other than hydrogen and helium. Based upon gyrochronology, the estimated age of this star is under 200 million years.

The SZ Crateris system is a member of the Ursa Major moving group of stars that have similar motions through space. The space velocity components of this system are U = , V =  and W = .

References

Crater (constellation)
Crateris, SZ
098712
055454
K-type main-sequence stars
M-type main-sequence stars
BY Draconis variables
Binary stars